Deirdre "Dee" Kelly (born 1971), also known as White Dee, is a British TV personality and actor. In 2014 and 2015 she appeared in the TV documentary series Benefits Street, and in 2014 she took part in Celebrity Big Brother. She plays Liz in the 2019 film Ray & Liz, directed by Richard Billingham.

In 2014, Kelly spoke at a Policy Exchange fringe meeting at the Conservative Party Conference in Birmingham.

Films
Ray (2015) – single-screen video artwork, she plays "Liz"
Ray & Liz (2018) – feature film, as "Liz"

Television
Benefits Street
[[Celebrity Big Brother (British series 14)|Celebrity Big Brother]] (British series 14)White Dee: What's the Fuss About? (2015) – documentaryWhen Reality TV Goes Horribly Wrong'' (2017) – documentary

References

External links

Ray & Liz (2018) trailer
Ray (2015) Trailer

1971 births
Living people
Actresses from Birmingham, West Midlands
21st-century English actresses